The British Virgin Islands national U-17 football team represents the British Virgin Islands in tournaments and friendly matches at the Under-17 level and is controlled by the British Virgin Islands Football Association.

2013 CONCACAF U-17 Championship qualification

Group E

At Trinidad & Tobago

See also
British Virgin Islands national football team

u17
Caribbean national under-17 association football teams